Middleton-in-Teesdale railway station was the terminus of the Tees Valley Railway from Barnard Castle. It served the town of Middleton-in-Teesdale. The station opened to passenger traffic on 12 May 1868. It closed for passengers on 30 November 1964 and freight traffic on 5 April 1965.

In the early hours of 31 January 2018, the former station house suffered serious structural damage in a fire, which was alleged to be the result of arson.

References

Further reading

External links
Middleton-in-Teesdale station at Disused Stations

Disused railway stations in County Durham
Former North Eastern Railway (UK) stations
Railway stations in Great Britain opened in 1868
Railway stations in Great Britain closed in 1964
Beeching closures in England